The 2005 mayoral election in Atlanta, Georgia took place on November 8, 2005 alongside other Atlanta municipal races. Incumbent Mayor Shirley Franklin faced no serious opposition and was reelected with 90.49% of the vote.

Results

References

2005 in Atlanta
2005 Georgia (U.S. state) elections
2005 United States mayoral elections
2005